Teresa Gaye Weatherspoon (born December 8, 1965) is an American professional basketball coach and former player who serves as assistant coach for the New Orleans Pelicans of the National Basketball Association (NBA). She played for the New York Liberty and Los Angeles Sparks of the Women's National Basketball Association (WNBA) and served as the head basketball coach of the Louisiana Tech Lady Techsters. Weatherspoon was inducted into the Women's Basketball Hall of Fame in 2010, and the Naismith Memorial Basketball Hall of Fame in 2019. In 2011, she was voted in by fans as one of the Top 15 players in WNBA history. In 2016, Weatherspoon was chosen to the WNBA Top 20@20, a list of the league's best 20 players ever in celebration of the WNBA's twentieth anniversary.

Playing and coaching career
Born in Pineland, Texas, Weatherspoon was a health and physical education major and star basketball player at Louisiana Tech. In 1988, her senior season, she led the Lady Techsters to the NCAA national title. After college, Weatherspoon played overseas in Italy, France and Russia for 8 years.

Weatherspoon is one of the original players of the WNBA in 1997 when she joined the New York Liberty in the WNBA's inaugural season. A talented ball-handler and charismatic leader, her energetic play quickly endeared her to the fans and media in New York. In 1997 she was the first winner of the league's Defensive Player of the Year Award. She won the title again in 1998. During the 1999 WNBA Finals, Weatherspoon had one of the most memorable feats in WNBA history; in Game 2, the Liberty were down 67–65 against the Houston Comets with no timeouts left and 2.4 seconds left on the game clock after a shot made by Tina Thompson. After receiving the inbound pass, Weatherspoon dribbled the ball up to half court and made a game-winning shot 50 feet away from the basket to force a Game 3. That moment would later be referred to as "The Shot". Up until the 2003 season, she held the distinction of being the only WNBA player to start every one of her games. After the 2003 season, she was not re-signed by the Liberty and signed with the Los Angeles Sparks. After her 2004 season with the Sparks, Weatherspoon retired.

In 2007 Weatherspoon was the head coach of the Westchester Phantoms of the American Basketball Association.  In April 2008 she joined the coaching staff of the Lady Techsters of Louisiana Tech.  On February 9, 2009, she was promoted to interim head coach to replace former head coach Chris Long. April 2, 2009 saw Louisiana Tech shed the interim label and name Teresa head women's basketball coach. In 2011, she was voted in by fans as one of the Top 15 players in the fifteen-year history of the WNBA. In 2016, Weatherspoon was named in the WNBA Top 20@20. On September 26, 2019, Weatherspoon was named two-way player development coach for the New Orleans Pelicans. Weatherspoon was later promoted to a full-time assistant coach for the Pelicans on November 16, 2020.

National team career
Weatherspoon was selected to represent the US at the inaugural Goodwill games, held in Moscow in July 1986. North Carolina State's Kay Yow served as head coach. The team opened up with a 72–53 of Yugoslavia, and followed that with a 21-point win over Brazil 91–70. The third game was against Czechoslovakia and would be much closer, ending in a 78–70 victory. The USA faced Bulgaria in the semi-final match up, and again won, this time 67–58. This set up the final against the Soviet Union, led by 7-foot-2 Ivilana Semenova, considered the most dominant player in the world. The Soviet team, had a 152–2 record in major international competition over the prior three decades, including an 84–82 win over the US in the 1983 World Championships. The Soviets held the early edge, leading 21–19 at one time, before the USA went on a scoring run to take a large lead they would never relinquish. The final score was 83–60 in favor of the US, earning the gold medal for the USA squad. For the entire event, Teresa Gaye Weatherspoon averaged 1.6 points per game.

Weatherspoon continued with the National team at the 1986 World Championship, held in Moscow, a month after the Goodwill games in Moscow, although she was injured and unable to play. The USA team was even more dominant this time. The early games were won easily, and the semifinal against Canada, while the closest game for the USA so far, ended up an 82–59 victory.  At the same time, the Soviet team was winning easily as well, and the final game pitted two teams each with 6–0 records. The Soviet team, having lost only once at home, wanted to show that the Goodwill games setback was a fluke. The USA team started by scoring the first eight points, and raced to a 45–23 lead, although the Soviets fought back and reduced the halftime margin to 13. The USA went on a 15–1 run in the second half to put the game away, and ended up winning the gold medal with a score of 108–88.

Weatherspoon was selected to be a member of the team representing the US at the 1987 World University Games held in Zagreb, Yugoslavia. The USA team won four of the five contests.  After winning their first two games against Poland and Finland, the USA faced the host team Yugoslavia. The game went to overtime, but Yugoslavia prevailed, 93–89. The USA faced China in the next game. They won 84–83, but they needed to win by at least five points to remain in medal contention. They won the final game against Canada to secure fifth place. Weatherspoon averaged 8.6 points per games. She recorded 21 steals over the course of the event, tied for first place on the team.

Head coaching record

Personal life
Weatherspoon was born to Charles and Rowena Weatherspoon in Pineland, Texas. Her father, Charles Sr., played minor league baseball in the Minnesota Twins' farm system, and holds the record for the most grand slams (3) in a minor league game. Weatherspoon has two brothers and three sisters. She credits her family, especially her mother Rowena Weatherspoon, as the biggest influence on her basketball career. Her fans call her by her nicknames "T-Spoon" or "Spoon". She and former  Atlanta Falcons linebacker Sean Weatherspoon are second cousins.

In 1999, she published a book titled Teresa Weatherspoon's Basketball for Girls, filled with anecdotes and advice on improving basketball skills for young girls.

Career highlights
 WNBA no. 2 all-time in career assists
 Led the New York Liberty to the first ever WNBA Finals in 1997 and again in 1999
 Started in the first five WNBA All-Star games (1999–2003 )
 All-WNBA Second Team (1997–2000)
 WNBA Defensive Player of the Year (1997, 1998)
 Hit a memorable court to court shot to tie the WNBA Finals series with the Houston Comets in 1999
 Started all her WNBA games up until the 2003 season
 Inducted into the Naismith Basketball Hall of Fame, Class of 2019

Career statistics

WNBA

Regular season

|-
| style="text-align:left;"|
| style="text-align:left;"|New York
| 28 || 28 || 33.0 || .467 || .086 || .650 || 4.1 || style="background:#d3d3d3;"|6.2° || style="background:#d3d3d3;"|3.0° || .1 || 3.4 || 7.0
|-
| style="text-align:left;"|
| style="text-align:left;"|New York
| 30 || 30 || 33.4 || .388 || .327 || .609 || 4.0 || 6.4 || style="background:#e0cef2;"|3.3 || .0 || 3.2 || 6.8
|-
| style="text-align:left;"|
| style="text-align:left;"|New York
| 32 || 32 || 33.9 || .421 || .378 || .679 || 3.3 || 6.4 || 2.4 || .1 || 2.5 || 7.2
|-
| style="text-align:left;"|
| style="text-align:left;"|New York
| 32 || 32 || 33.7 || .438 || .250 || .741 || 3.4 || 6.4 || 2.0 || .2 || 2.7 || 6.4
|-
| style="text-align:left;"|
| style="text-align:left;"|New York
| 32 || 32 || 30.4 || .431 || .385 || .671 || 3.7 || 6.3 || 1.7 || .1 || 2.5 || 6.5
|-
| style="text-align:left;"|
| style="text-align:left;"|New York
| 32 || 32 || 29.8 || .342 || .100 || .519 || 2.7 || 5.7 || 1.3 || .1 || 2.4 || 3.4
|-
| style="text-align:left;"|
| style="text-align:left;"|New York
| 34 || 34 || 24.2 || .385 || .000 || .750 || 2.9 || 4.4 || .8 || .1 || 1.8 || 2.9
|-
| style="text-align:left;"|
| style="text-align:left;"|Los Angeles
| 34 || 0 || 8.6 || .320 || .333 ||  || .9 || .9 || .4 || .0 || .8 || .5
|- class="sortbottom"
| style="text-align:center;" colspan="2"|Career
| 254 || 220 || 28.1 || .411 || .281 || .658 || 3.1 || 5.3 || 1.8 || .1 || 2.4 || 5.0

Playoffs

|-
| style="text-align:left;"|1997
| style="text-align:left;"|New York
| 2 || 2 || 37.5 || .500 || .000 || .000 || 1.5 || 5.0 || 2.0 || .0 || 6.0 || 5.0
|-
| style="text-align:left;"|1999
| style="text-align:left;"|New York
| 6 || 6 || 33.8 || .452 || .368 || .750 || 3.5 || style="background:#d3d3d3;"|7.5° || 1.0 || .0 || 2.0 || 8.5
|-
| style="text-align:left;"|2000
| style="text-align:left;"|New York
| 7 || 7 || 36.1 || .353 || .200 || .636 || 2.7 || style="background:#d3d3d3;"|7.0° || 2.7 || .0 || 2.9 || 4.6
|-
| style="text-align:left;"|2001
| style="text-align:left;"|New York
| 6 || 6 || 33.0 || .211 || .273 || 1.000 || 3.7 || 4.7 || 1.2 || .0 || .8 || 3.8
|-
| style="text-align:left;"|2002
| style="text-align:left;"|New York
| 8 || 8 || 30.1 || .475 || .000 || .833 || 4.4 || 6.6 || 1.0 || .0 || 1.8 || 6.6
|-
| style="text-align:left;"|2004
| style="text-align:left;"|Los Angeles
| 2 || 0 || 5.0 || .000 || .000 || .000 || 1.0 || .5 || .5 || .0 || 1.5 || .0
|- class="sortbottom"
| style="text-align:center;" colspan="2"|Career
| 31 || 29 || 31.6 || .382 || .282 || .744 || 3.3 || 6.0 || 1.5 || .0 || 2.1 || 5.5

College
Source

Awards and honors
As a basketball player:
 1986 World Championships Gold Medalist (with Team USA)
 1986 Goodwill Games Gold Medalist (with Team USA)
 1987 World University Games Gold Medalist (with Team USA)
 1988 Olympic Games Gold Medalist (with Team USA)
 1988 Wade Trophy
 1988 Honda Sports Award for basketball
 1988 Honda-Broderick Cup winner for all sports
 1992 Olympic Games Bronze Medalist (with Team USA)
 2010 Inducted into the Women's Basketball Hall of Fame as part of the class of 2010
 2010 Inducted into the Louisiana Sports Hall of Fame
 2011 Inducted into the New York Liberty Ring of Honor
 2011 Named one of top 15 WNBA Players of All-Time
 2019 Inducted into the Naismith Memorial Basketball Hall of Fame
 2020 Inducted into the Texas Sports Hall of Fame

As head coach of Louisiana Tech Lady Techsters:
 2009 WAC Regular Season Champions
 2009 WNIT Second Round
 2010 WAC Tournament Champions
 2010 NCAA Tournament
 2010 Maggie Dixon Division I Rookie Coach of the Year
 2011 WAC Regular Season Champions
 2011 NCAA Tournament
 2011 WBCA Region 7 Coach of the Year

See also

 List of female NBA coaches
 1987 NCAA Women's Division I Basketball Tournament
 List of NCAA Division I women's basketball career assists leaders

References

External links
 New York Post- Liberty Team Page
 Teresa Weatherspoon Profile at Louisiana Tech

1965 births
Living people
African-American basketball coaches
African-American basketball players
All-American college women's basketball players
American expatriate basketball people in Italy
American expatriate basketball people in Russia
American women's basketball coaches
American women's basketball players
Basketball coaches from Texas
Basketball players at the 1988 Summer Olympics
Basketball players at the 1992 Summer Olympics
Basketball players from Texas
Los Angeles Sparks players
Louisiana Tech Lady Techsters basketball coaches
Louisiana Tech Lady Techsters basketball players
Medalists at the 1988 Summer Olympics
Medalists at the 1992 Summer Olympics
Naismith Memorial Basketball Hall of Fame inductees
New Orleans Pelicans assistant coaches
New York Liberty players
Olympic bronze medalists for the United States in basketball
Olympic gold medalists for the United States in basketball
People from Pineland, Texas
Point guards
Women's National Basketball Association All-Stars
21st-century African-American people
21st-century African-American women
20th-century African-American sportspeople
20th-century African-American women
United States women's national basketball team players